Buldhana Assembly constituency is one of the 288 constituencies of Maharashtra Vidhan Sabha and one of the seven which are located in Buldhana district.

It is a part of the Buldhana Lok Sabha constituency along with five other Vidhan Sabha(assembly) constituencies, viz. Chikhali,  Sindkhed Raja,   Mehkar (SC), Khamgaon and Jalgaon (Jamod),

The seventh Malkapur from Buldhana district is a part of the Raver Lok Sabha constituency from neighbouring Jalgaon district.

As of 2008, the constituency comprises all of the Motala taluka and part of the Buldhana taluka with Buldhana Rural and Padali revenue circles along with Buldhana Municipal Council.

Members of Legislative Assembly

Election results

Assembly Elections 2014

General elections, 2019

See also
Buldhana
Motala

Notes

Assembly constituencies of Maharashtra
Buldhana